The West Coast Blues 'n' Roots Festival is an annual music festival held in Fremantle, Western Australia. It features many blues and roots performers, both international and local.

History
The festival was founded by Sunset Events and began as a two-day event in 2004 and was called the 'Sunset Live's Botanic Blues, Roots and Soul' held at Kings Park, Western Australia. From 2005, the event became a one-day event and was known as the West Coast Blues & Roots held at the Esplanade Park, Fremantle. In 2007, the event expanded to a two-day event and followed on into 2008. The 2009 event saw a return to a single day format. In 2010, the festival moved to Fremantle Park and has been there since 2010. To celebrate the 10th anniversary of the festival, organisers have announced the return two-day format for the 2013 lineup. The festival was not held in 2016 nor 2020. It is similar to the East Coast Blues & Roots Music Festival, which is held on the Easter long weekend in Byron Bay.

Artist lineups

2004
Day 1

James Brown
The Cat Empire
Bomba
Xavier Rudd
Blue Shaddy
B Movie Heroes
Dave Mann Collective
Mark Hoffman
Belly
Lucky Oceans 
Lois Olney
Simon Cox
Ivan Zar
Ben Witt

Day 2
Michael Franti and Spearhead
John Butler Trio
Dr. John
Taj Mahal
Xavier Rudd
Rick Steele 
Carus
The Wah Trees
Pink and White Bridge
WAADA

2005

Jack Johnson
Violent Femmes
The Waifs
Xavier Rudd
Angélique Kidjo
G. Love & Special Sauce
The Beautiful Girls
John Lee Hooker Jnr
Bob Brozman & René Lacaille
Carus
Jeff Lang
Joel Turner and the Modern Day Poets
Eugene Hideaway Bridges
Ash Grunwald
Vasco Era
Hat Fitz
Zydecats
Mia Dyson
Mark Hoffman (Em Dee)
Blue Shaddy
Toby & Code Red
B Movie Heroes
 Dom Mariani & The Majestic Kelp
Saritah
Dave Mann Collective
Ben Witt & Ivan Zar
Honeyriders
Ric Steele
43 Cambridge
Kill Devil Hills
West Coast Blues Club Showcase

2006

Jackson Browne
The Black Keys
Bernard Fanning
Michael Franti
Damian Marley
Pete Murray
Jamie Cullum
Donavon Frankenreiter
The Beautiful Girls
Keb' Mo'
Mia Dyson
Carus
Lucky Oceans
Ash Grunwald
Blue King Brown
Josh Pyke
Bobby Blackbird 
Blue Shaddy

2007

Saturday, 31 March 2007
John Butler Trio
Wolfmother
The Cat Empire
Xavier Rudd
Gomez
Lee "Scratch" Perry
Sierra Leone's Refugee All Stars
Béla Fleck & The Flecktones
Tony Joe White
Eric Burdon & The Animals
Bob Evans
The Pilgram Brothers
Blue King Brown
The Vasco Era
Diafrix
The Bamboos
The Fumes
Andrew Winton
Blue Shaddy
Fall Electric

Sunday, 1 April 2007
Ben Harper
John Mayer
Missy Higgins
The Waifs
Bo Diddley
Larry Carlton Blues Project
Eugene Hideaway Bridges
Kaki King
Angus & Julia Stone
Terrance Simien
Piers Faccini
Amos Lee
Carus and The True Believers
Ben Kweller
Custom Kings
Dom Mariani and The Majestic Kelp
Will Conner
Kill Devil Hills

 The Dave Matthews Band and The Roots were originally included in the line up but were a late withdrawal and the spot was replaced by Xavier Rudd.

2008

Saturday, 15 March 2008
Sinéad O'Connor
Don McLean
Buddy Guy
Ray Davies
Maceo Parker
Gotye
Ian Brown
Keb' Mo'
KT Tunstall
Xavier Rudd
The Cruel Sea
Jeff Martin
The Bellrays
Clare Bowditch & The Feeding Set
Angus & Julia Stone
Jason Mraz
Hayley Sales
O.A.R.
Lior
Damien Dempsey
The Basics
Common Ground
The Shinkickers
Will Stoker & The Embers
Sneaky Weasel Gang
Rick Steele

Sunday, 16 March 2008
John Fogerty
Eskimo Joe
Kasey Chambers
Cat Empire
Jools Holland's Rhythm and Blues Orchestra
Ozomatli
Vusi Mahlasela,
Lee Ritenour
Patty Griffin
G. Love & Special Sauce
The Beautiful Girls
Galactic 
Salmonella Dub
Mia Dyson
Jeff Lang
Seasick Steve
The Audreys
The Angry Tradesmen
Sugarland
Ivan Zar
Worldfly
Abbe May & The Rockin' Pnuemonia
Matt Gresham
The Funkalleros

2009
John Butler Trio
Jason Mraz
Missy Higgins
Paul Kelly
Zappa Plays Zappa
Tony Joe White
Augie March
Ben Kweller
Seasick Steve
Easy Star All-Stars
Blue King Brown
Bob Evans
Eric Bibb
The Special Beat
Luka Bloom
Blues Traveler
C. W. Stoneking & The Primitive Horn Orchestra
Charlie Parr
Little Red
Ruthie Foster 
Kev Carmody
LABJACD
Rodney Crowe
Whitley
Kora
Little Bushman
Mama Kin
Bonjah
Mister And Sunbird

2010
Line-up:
Crowded House
John Butler Trio
Buddy Guy
Jeff Beck
Newton Faulkner
The Swell Season
John Mayall
Angus & Julia Stone
Ozomatli
Gogol Bordello
Taj Mahal
Lisa Mitchell
Matisyahu
Old Crow Medicine Show
Edward Sharpe and the Magnetic Zeros
The Backsliders 
Dave Hole
Jon Cleary
Dan Sultan
Wagons
Tijuana Cartel
Hayley Sales
Mary Gauthier
The Blues Preachers
Jordie Lane
Andrew Winton
Red Shoes Boy
The Joe Kings
The CBC Jazz Orchestra with Lee Sappho

2011
Bob Dylan
Grace Jones
Elvis Costello and the Imposters
The Cat Empire
Rodrigo y Gabriela
Geoffrey Gurrumul Yunupingu
Michael Franti and Spearhead
The Blind Boys of Alabama with Aaron Neville
RocKwiz Live
Mavis Staples
Robert Randolph and the Family Band
Toots and the Maytals
Washington
Ruthie Foster
James Teague
 The 2011 West Coast Blues & Roots Festival also included a live showing of the popular music quiz show RocKwiz.

2012
John Fogerty
Crosby, Stills & Nash
The Pogues
The Specials
My Morning Jacket
Blitzen Trapper
Buddy Guy
Keb' Mo'
Steve Earle
Trombone Shorty & Orleans Avenue
Gin Wigmore
Husky
The Sheepdogs
Zydecats
Felicity Groom
Ruby Boots
The Seals

2013

Saturday, 23 March 2013
Robert Plant
Iggy & The Stooges
Chris Isaak 
Jason Mraz
Status Quo
Manu Chao
Tedeschi Trucks Band
Fred Wesley and the New JBs
Newton Faulkner 
Julia Stone
The Music Maker Blues Revue
Kitty, Daisy & Lewis
Grace Potter
Russell Morris
Mama Kin
Blue Shaddy
Breakthrough Winner

Sunday, 24 March 2013
Paul Simon
Ben Harper with Charlie Musselwhite
Santana
Steve Miller Band
Wilco
Bonnie Raitt
Jimmy Cliff
Rufus Wainwright
Michael Kiwanuka
Gossling
Ash Grunwald
Graveyard Train
Brothers Grim
The Brow Horn Orchestra
Sticky Fingers
The Domnicks
Davey Craddock and The Spectacles

2014
John Mayer
Dave Matthews Band
Elvis Costello and the Imposters
The Doobie Brothers 
Erykah Badu
Matt Corby
Boy & Bear
Michael Franti & Spearhead
Jake Bugg
Edward Sharpe and the Magnetic Zeros
Gary Clark Jr.
Steve Earle & The Dukes
Morcheeba
Russell Morris
The Soul Rebels
Dave Hole

2015
John Butler Trio
Paolo Nutini
David Gray
Paul Kelly 
Jurassic 5
Rodrigo y Gabriela
George Clinton & Parliament Funkadelic
Xavier Rudd and the United Nations
Jimmy Cliff
Keb' Mo'
Mavis Staples
Beth Hart
Kim Churchill
Lanie Lane

See also

East Coast International Blues & Roots Music Festival
List of blues festivals
List of folk festivals

References

External links

West Coast Blues & Roots Festival website
 West Coast Blues & Roots Festival MySpace Website

Music festivals established in 2004
Blues festivals in Australia
Folk festivals in Australia
Culture of Western Australia